General elections were held in the Bahamas on 2 May 2002. The opposition Progressive Liberal Party (PLP) won 29 of the 40 seats in the House of Assembly to defeat the governing Free National Movement (FNM). Voter turnout was 90.2%.

Background
In the 1992 election the Free National Movement came to power after defeating the then governing Progressive Liberal Party. Their leader Hubert Ingraham served as Prime Minister from 1992 until he announced his intention to step down as Prime Minister at the 2002 general election. Tommy Turnquest was then narrowly elected as the next leader of the FNM and would be the party's candidate for Prime Minister at the election.

The FNM government suffered a setback in February 2002 when an attempt to amend the constitution was rejected in a referendum. The referendum had been contested between the two main parties after the PLP reversed their earlier support and campaigned against the changes.

Campaign
A record 132 candidates stood in the election for the 40 seats in the House of Assembly that were being contested. These were from 4 political parties and included 40 from the governing FNM and 37 from the opposition PLP. As well as the candidates from political parties there were also 14 independents.

The FNM defended their time in government, pointing to the strong economic growth over the period and the large amount of foreign investment that had come into the Bahamas. Their new leader Tommy Turnquest pledged to continue as they had been doing under Hubert Ingraham. However the opposition PLP criticised the FNM as being out of touch and attacked them for being too quick to comply with the OECD's Financial Action Task Force on Money Laundering. The PLP said that they would help the less well off and develop islands they said had been neglected by the FNM.

Both parties made fierce attacks on each other with the FNM reminding voters of the scandals over drug money that had led to the PLP losing power back in 1992. Meanwhile, the PLP accused the FNM's Tommy Turnquest of corruption over the awarding of government contracts. Despite the harsh campaign, outside commentators expected little change in policies whichever party was successful in the election.

There was no trouble on election day, with schools and liquor stores being closed and polling stations seeing a high turnout.

Results
The results saw the PLP win over half of the vote and 29 of the seats in the House of Assembly. The FNM conceded defeat, with their leader Tommy Turnquest being one of several cabinet ministers to lose their seats. The leader of the PLP, Perry Christie, became the new Prime Minister of the Bahamas on 3 May 2002.

Elected MPs

References

Elections in the Bahamas
Bahamas
General election